Mitzic Airport  was an airport serving the town of Mitzic in the Woleu-Ntem Province of Gabon. The runway is within the village. The airport has been decommissioned.

See also

 List of airports in Gabon
 Transport in Gabon

References

External links
Mitzic Airport
OpenStreetMap - Mitzic
OurAirports - Mitzic
HERE/Nokia - Mitzic

Airports in Gabon